Brian Gibson (22 February 1928 – 11 May 2010) was an English professional footballer born in Huddersfield, who played as a defender in the Football League for Huddersfield Town.

References

1928 births
2010 deaths
Footballers from Huddersfield
English footballers
Association football defenders
Huddersfield Town A.F.C. players
English Football League players
Place of birth missing